Peter Morris (born 3 December 1937) is a former New Zealand cricketer. He played ten first-class matches for Auckland between 1961 and 1963.

See also
 List of Auckland representative cricketers

References

External links
 

1937 births
Living people
New Zealand cricketers
Auckland cricketers
Cricketers from Auckland